Charles Silmon (born July 4, 1991) is an American sprinter who specialises in the 100 and 200 metres. He won a two medals (one gold, one silver) at the 2010 World Junior Championships in Athletics.  A native of Waco, Texas, Silmon attended Texas Christian University.

Career

At the 2010 World Junior Championships in Athletics, Silmon won a silver medal in the 100 metres, finishing behind Dexter Lee in a personal best time of 10.23 s. Silmon then combined with Mike Granger, Eric Harris, and Oliver Bradwell in the 4×100 metres relay to finish first ahead of Jamaica and Trinidad and Tobago.
On June 7, 2013, Silmon became the NCAA 100m Champion, clocking in a wind-aided 9.89 seconds. The time tied the meet record under all conditions, though the wind (3.2 meters/second) disqualified it as an NCAA record.
On the 21st June 2013, Silmon clocked 9.98 in the 100m at the US World Trials. He will be competing at the World Championships at Moscow in August.

Personal bests

References

External links
 
 
 
 Charles Silmon at DyeStat
 TCU Horned Frogs bio

1991 births
Living people
American male sprinters
TCU Horned Frogs men's track and field athletes